Sisters of Death is a 1977 American mystery slasher film written by Peter Arnold and Elwyn Richards, and directed by Joseph Mazzuca. The film stars Arthur Franz and Claudia Jennings. Seven years after a sorority member is killed during a game of russian roulette, the victim's father lures the remaining sisters to his estate where he begins killing them.

Sisters of Death was theatrically released in 1977, though it was filmed in 1972.

Plot
During an all-girl secret society college initiation, one of the new members is killed. Seven years later, the survivors are invited to a college reunion at a lavish estate, which turns out to be owned by the crazed father of the girl who died. He reveals to the girls that one them witnessed foul play and is helping him. The girls then run off screaming and try to leave, but he turns on the electric fence that surrounds the property, trapping them. The girls and the two hired men that drove them there start getting killed off one by one until there are only two survivors.

Cast
Arthur Franz as Edmond Clybourn
Claudia Jennings as Judy
Cheri Howell as Sylvia
Sherry Boucher as Diana
Paul Carr as Mark
Joe E. Tata as Joe
Sherry Alberoni as Francie
Roxanne Albee as Penny
Elizabeth Bergen as Liz
Paul Fierro as Mexican
Vern Mathison as Police Officer

Release
The film was released theatrically in the United States by First American Films in 1977, but was filmed in 1972.

The film was released as a downloadable Video on Demand by Rifftrax on April 25, 2014.  The release included a running, mocking, commentary by Mike Nelson, Kevin Murphy and Bill Corbett, formerly of Mystery Science Theater 3000.

References

External links 

1977 films
1977 horror films
American slasher films
1970s slasher films
1970s English-language films
1970s American films